Nikita Dmitrievich Khakimov (born 13 June 1988) is a Russian badminton player. Khakimov educated economics at the Moscow State Forest University, and competed at the 2015 Summer Universiade in Gwangju, South Korea. Khakimov was part of the Russian national team that won the bronze medal at the 2020 European Men's Team Championships.

Achievements

BWF International Challenge/Series 
Men's doubles

Mixed doubles

  BWF International Challenge tournament
  BWF International Series tournament
  BWF Future Series tournament

References

External links 
 

1988 births
Living people
Badminton players from Moscow
Russian male badminton players